ISO 3166-2:MH is the entry for the Marshall Islands in ISO 3166-2, part of the ISO 3166 standard published by the International Organization for Standardization (ISO), which defines codes for the names of the principal subdivisions (e.g., provinces or states) of all countries coded in ISO 3166-1.

Currently for the Marshall Islands, ISO 3166-2 codes are defined for two levels of subdivisions:
 2 chains (of islands) (i.e., the Ralik Chain and the Ratak Chain)
 24 municipalities

The municipalities are inhabited atolls or islands. The ten uninhabited atolls and islands of the country are not listed:
 In Ralik Chain: Ailinginae Atoll, Bikini Atoll, Rongerik Atoll, and Ujelang Atoll (previously inhabited and had its code deleted in Newsletter II-1)
 In Ratak Chain: Bikar Atoll, Bokak Atoll, Erikub Atoll, Jemo Island, Nadikdik Atoll, and Toke Atoll

Each code consists of two parts, separated by a hyphen. The second part is either of the following:
 one letter: chains (of islands)
 three letters: municipalities

Current codes
Subdivision names are listed as in the ISO 3166-2 standard published by the ISO 3166 Maintenance Agency (ISO 3166/MA).

Click on the button in the header to sort each column.

Chains (of islands)

Municipalities

Changes
The following changes to the entry have been announced in newsletters by the ISO 3166/MA since the first publication of ISO 3166-2 in 1998:

See also
 Subdivisions of the Marshall Islands

External links
 ISO Online Browsing Platform: MH
 Municipalities of the Marshall Islands, Statoids.com

2:MH
ISO 3166-2
Marshall Islands-related lists